Władysław Grabowski (1 June 1883 – 6 July 1961) was a Polish film actor. He appeared in more than 35 films between 1911 and 1957, mainly in supporting comedy roles.

Biography 
He was born on June 1, 1883 in Warsaw as the son of Władysław and Joanna née Szałowicz. A graduate of the Drama Class of the Warsaw Music Society. He made his debut in the theater in 1905. He performed on the stages of theaters in Łódź, Warsaw, Kraków and St. Petersburg. He made his cinema debut in 1911 as the rabbi's assistant in the film Meir Ezofowicz. He acted in many films of the interwar period. He was primarily a comedy actor. He died on July 6, 1961 in Warsaw and was buried in the Alley of Merit at the Powązki Cemetery in Warsaw (grave 72).

Selected filmography
 Pan Twardowski (1921)
 The Unspeakable (1924)
 The Unthinkable (1926)
 Wacuś (1935)
 Kochaj tylko mnie (1935)
 Bolek i Lolek (1936)
 30 karatów szczęścia (1936)
 Dodek na froncie (1936)
 Daddy Gets Married (1936)
 Wrzos (1938)

References

External links

1883 births
1961 deaths
Polish male film actors
Polish male silent film actors
Male actors from Warsaw
People from Warsaw Governorate
Recipients of the Order of Polonia Restituta
Polish male stage actors
20th-century Polish male actors